The 2018 FIBA Europe SuperCup Women was the 8th edition of the FIBA Europe SuperCup Women. It was held on 17 October 2018 at the DIVS Sport Hall in Yekaterinburg, Russia.

Final

References

External links
 SuperCup Women

2018
2018–19 in European women's basketball
2018–19 in Turkish basketball
2018–19 in Russian basketball
International women's basketball competitions hosted by Russia
Sport in Yekaterinburg
October 2018 sports events in Russia